Sweepers is a 1998 American-South African action film directed by Keoni Waxman and starring Dolph Lundgren, Claire Stansfield and Bruce Payne.

Plot

Christian Erickson (Dolph Lundgren) used to work as a leading demolition expert. As Erickson was working to disarm mines, his son was killed by one, and Erickson retired. He is called out of retirement to help Michelle Flynn (Claire Stansfield) to disarm mine fields in a humanitarian minesweeping operation in Angola. Erickson subsequently discovers that new mines are being planted to kill people in the area.

Cast

Dolph Lundgren as Christian Erickson 
Claire Stansfield as Michelle Flynn 
Bruce Payne as Dr. Cecil Hopper 
Sheldon Allen as Body Double/Stuntman 
Ian Roberts as Yager 
Fats Bookholane as Old Mo 
Sifiso Maphanga as Arthur 
Ross Preller as Jack Trask 
Nick Boraine as Mitch 
Cecil Carter as Ray Gunn 
David Dukas as Sweeper #4 
Zukile Ggobose as Zukili  
Philip Notununu as Mercenary #1 
Gabriel Mndaweni as Mercenary #2 
Frank Pereira as Mercenary #3 
Dave Ridley as Mercenary #4
Frikkie Botes as Scientist in Lab
Jurgen Helberg as Scientist  in lab

Reception

Critical response
Bryan Kristopowitz stated that Sweepers is a 'terrific action movie' which is 'filled with multiple explosions and copious amounts of gunplay' and is 'one of the star Lundgren’s best of the 1990s'. Another reviewer stated that Sweepers is 'graced with some beautiful location shooting, a great cast, a quality story with political implications and solid direction'. A different reviewer stated that the film is a 'hidden gem in the career of Dolph Lundgren'. In contrast, Mick Martin and Marsha Porter stated that the film was evidence the Lundgren's career had hit 'rock bottom'. A reviewer for Video Store Magazine stated that the film was 'pretty standard fare, with lots of gunfire and dialogue loaded with unintentional laughs'.

References

External links
 
 
 

1998 films
1990s English-language films
English-language South African films
Films shot in Angola
Films set in Angola
1998 action films
Films directed by Keoni Waxman
Films produced by Elie Samaha
South African action films
American action films
1990s American films